Hermes is an Olympian deity in ancient Greek religion and mythology. Hermes is considered the herald of the gods. He is also considered the protector of human heralds, travellers, thieves, merchants, and orators. He is able to move quickly and freely between the worlds of the mortal and the divine, aided by his winged sandals. Hermes plays the role of the psychopomp or "soul guide"—a conductor of souls into the afterlife.

In myth, Hermes functions as the emissary and messenger of the gods, and is often presented as the son of Zeus and Maia, the Pleiad. Hermes is regarded as "the divine trickster," about which the Homeric Hymn to Hermes offers the most well-known account.

His attributes and symbols include the herma, the rooster, the tortoise, satchel or pouch, talaria (winged sandals), and winged helmet or simple petasos, as well as the palm tree, goat, the number four, several kinds of fish, and incense. However, his main symbol is the caduceus, a winged staff intertwined with two snakes copulating and carvings of the other gods. His attributes had previously influenced the earlier Etruscan god Turms, a name borrowed from the Greek "herma".

In Roman mythology and religion many of Hermes' characteristics belong to Mercury, a name derived from the Latin merx, meaning "merchandise," and the origin of the words "merchant" and "commerce."

Name and origin
The earliest form of the name Hermes is the Mycenaean Greek *hermāhās, written  e-ma-a2 (e-ma-ha) in the Linear B syllabic script. Most scholars derive "Hermes" from Greek ἕρμα (herma), "stone heap."

The etymology of ἕρμα itself is unknown, but is probably not a Proto-Indo-European word. R. S. P. Beekes rejects the connection with herma and suggests a Pre-Greek origin. However, the stone etymology is also linked to Indo-European *ser- ("to bind, put together"). Scholarly speculation that "Hermes" derives from a more primitive form meaning "one cairn" is disputed. Other scholars have suggested that Hermes may be a cognate of the Vedic Sarama.

It is likely that Hermes is a pre-Hellenic god, though the exact origins of his worship, and its original nature, remain unclear. Frothingham thought the god to have existed as a Mesopotamian snake-god, similar or identical to Ningishzida, a god who served as mediator between humans and the divine, especially Ishtar, and who was depicted in art as a Caduceus. Angelo (1997) thinks Hermes to be based on the Thoth archetype. The absorbing ("combining") of the attributes of Hermes to Thoth developed after the time of Homer amongst Greeks and Romans; Herodotus was the first to identify the Greek god with the Egyptian (Hermopolis) (Plutarch and Diodorus also did so), although Plato thought the gods were dissimilar (Friedlander 1992).

His cult was established in Greece in remote regions, likely making him originally a god of nature, farmers, and shepherds. It is also possible that since the beginning he has been a deity with shamanic attributes linked to divination, reconciliation, magic, sacrifices, and initiation and contact with other planes of existence, a role of mediator between the worlds of the visible and invisible. According to a theory that has received considerable scholarly acceptance, Hermes originated as a form of the god Pan, who has been identified as a reflex of the Proto-Indo-European pastoral god *Péh2usōn, in his aspect as the god of boundary markers. Later, the epithet supplanted the original name itself and Hermes took over the roles as god of messengers, travelers, and boundaries, which had originally belonged to Pan, while Pan himself continued to be venerated by his original name in his more rustic aspect as the god of the wild in the relatively isolated mountainous region of Arcadia. In later myths, after the cult of Pan was reintroduced to Attica, Pan was said to be Hermes's son.

Iconography

The image of Hermes evolved and varied along with Greek art and culture. In Archaic Greece he was usually depicted as a mature man, bearded, and dressed as a traveler, herald, or shepherd. This image remained common on the Hermai, which served as boundary markers, roadside markers, and grave markers, as well as votive offerings.

In Classical and Hellenistic Greece, Hermes was usually depicted as a young, athletic man lacking a beard. When represented as Logios (Greek: Λόγιος, speaker), his attitude is consistent with the attribute. Phidias left a statue of a famous Hermes Logios and Praxiteles another, also well known, showing him with the baby Dionysus in his arms.

At all times, however, through the Hellenistic periods, Roman, and throughout Western history into the present day, several of his characteristic objects are present as identification, but not always all together. Among these objects is a wide-brimmed hat, the petasos, widely used by rural people of antiquity to protect themselves from the sun, and that in later times was adorned with a pair of small wings; sometimes this hat is not present, and may have been replaced with wings rising from the hair.

Another object is the caduceus, a staff with two intertwined snakes, sometimes crowned with a pair of wings and a sphere. The caduceus, historically, appeared with Hermes, and is documented among the Babylonians from about 3500 BC. Two snakes coiled around a staff was also a symbol of the god Ningishzida, who, like Hermes, served as a mediator between humans and the divine (specifically, the goddess Ishtar or the supreme Ningirsu). In Greece, other gods have been depicted holding a caduceus, but it was mainly associated with Hermes. It was said to have the power to make people fall asleep or wake up, and also made peace between litigants, and is a visible sign of his authority, being used as a sceptre. A similar-appearing but distinct symbol is the Rod of Asclepius, associated with the patron of medicine and son of Apollo, Asclepius, which bears only one snake. The Rod of Asclepius, occasionally conflated with the caduceus in modern times, is used by most Western physicians as a badge of their profession. After the Renaissance, the caduceus also appeared in the heraldic crests of several, and currently is a symbol of commerce.

Hermes' sandals, called pédila by the Greeks and talaria by the Romans, were made of palm and myrtle branches but were described as beautiful, golden and immortal, made a sublime art, able to take the roads with the speed of wind. Originally, they had no wings, but late in the artistic representations, they are depicted. In certain images, the wings spring directly from the ankles. Hermes has also been depicted with a purse or a bag in his hands, wearing a robe or cloak, which had the power to confer invisibility. His weapon was a sword of gold, which killed Argos; it was also lent to Perseus to kill Medusa.

Functions
Hermes began as a god with strong chthonic, or underworld, associations. He was a psychopomp, leader of souls along the road between "the Under and the Upper world". This function gradually expanded to encompass roads in general, and from there to boundaries, travelers, sailors, and commerce.

As a chthonic and fertility god

Beginning with the earliest records of his worship, Hermes has been understood as a chthonic deity (heavily associated with the earth and/or underworld). As a chthonic deity, the worship of Hermes also included an aspect relating to fertility, with the phallus being included among his major symbols. The inclusion of phallic imagery associated with Hermes and placed, in the form of herma, at the entrances to households may reflect a belief in ancient times that Hermes was a symbol of the household's fertility, specifically the potency of the male head of the household in producing children.

The association between Hermes and the underworld is related to his function as a god of boundaries (the boundary between life and death), but he is considered a psychopomp, a deity who helps guide souls of the deceased to the afterlife, and his image was commonly depicted on gravestones in classical Greece.

As a god of boundaries

In Ancient Greece, Hermes was a phallic god of boundaries. His name, in the form herma, was applied to a wayside marker pile of stones and each traveler added a stone to the pile. In the 6th century BC, Hipparchus, the son of Pisistratus, replaced the cairns that marked the midway point between each village deme at the central agora of Athens with a square or rectangular pillar of stone or bronze topped by a bust of a bearded Hermes. An erect phallus rose from the base. In the more primitive Mount Kyllini or Cyllenian herms, the standing stone or wooden pillar was simply a carved phallus. "That a monument of this kind could be transformed into an Olympian god is astounding," Walter Burkert remarked. In Athens, herms were placed outside houses, both as a form of protection for the home, a symbol of male fertility, and as a link between the household and its gods with the gods of the wider community.

In 415 BC, on the night when the Athenian fleet was about to set sail for Syracuse during the Peloponnesian War, all of the Athenian hermai were vandalized. The Athenians at the time believed it was the work of saboteurs, either from Syracuse or from the anti-war faction within Athens itself. Socrates' pupil Alcibiades was suspected of involvement, and one of the charges eventually made against Socrates which led to his execution 16 years later was that he had either corrupted Alcibiades or failed to guide him away from his moral corruption.

As a messenger god
In association with his role as a psychopomp and god who is able to easily cross boundaries, Hermes is prominently worshiped as a messenger, often described as the messenger of the gods (since he can convey messages between the divine realms, the underworld, and the world of mortals). As a messenger and divine herald, he wears winged sandals (or, in Roman art influenced by Etruscan depictions of Turms, a winged cap).

As a shepherd god

Hermes was known as the patron god of flocks, herds, and shepherds, an attribute possibly tied to his early origin as an aspect of Pan. In Boeotia, Hermes was worshiped for having saved the town from a plague by carrying a ram or calf around the city walls. A yearly festival commemorated this event, during which a lamb would be carried around the city by "the most handsome boy" and then sacrificed, in order to purify and protect the city from disease, drought, and famine. Numerous depictions of Hermes as a shepherd god carrying a lamb on his shoulders (Hermes kriophoros) have been found throughout the Mediterranean world, and it is possible that the iconography of Hermes as "The Good Shepherd" had an influence on early Christianity, specifically in the description of Christ as "the Good Shepherd" in the Gospel of John.

Historical and literary sources

In the Mycenaean period
The earliest written record of Hermes comes from Linear B inscriptions from Pylos, Thebes, and Knossos dating to the Bronze Age Mycenaean period. Here, Hermes' name is rendered as e‐ma‐a (Ἑρμάhας). This name is always recorded alongside those of several goddesses, including Potnija, Posidaeja, Diwja, Hera, Pere, and Ipemedeja, indicating that his worship was strongly connected to theirs. This is a pattern that would continue in later periods, as worship of Hermes almost always took place within temples and sanctuaries primarily dedicated to goddesses, including Hera, Demeter, Hecate, and Despoina.

In the Archaic period
In literary works of Archaic Greece, Hermes is depicted both as a protector and a trickster. In Homer's Iliad, Hermes is called "the bringer of good luck", "guide and guardian", and "excellent in all the tricks". In Hesiod's The Works and Days, Hermes' is depicted giving Pandora the gifts of lies, seductive words, and a dubious character.

The earliest known theological or spiritual documents concerning Hermes are found in the c. 7th century BC Homeric Hymns. In Homeric Hymn 4 to Hermes describes the god's birth and his theft of Apollo's sacred cattle. In this hymn, Hermes is invoked as a god "of many shifts" (polytropos), associated with cunning and thievery, but also a bringer of dreams and a night guardian. He is said to have invented the chelys lyre, as well as racing and the sport of wrestling.

In the Classical period

The cult of Hermes flourished in Attica, and many scholars writing before the discovery of the Linear B evidence considered Hermes to be a uniquely Athenian god. This region had numerous Hermai, or pillar-like icons, dedicated to the god marking boundaries, crossroads, and entryways. These were initially stone piles, later pillars made of wood, stone, or bronze, with carved images of Hermes, a phallus, or both. In the context of these herms, by the Classical period Hermes had come to be worshiped as the patron god of travelers and sailors. By the 5th century BC, Hermai were also in common use as grave monuments, emphasizing Hermes' role as a chthonic deity and psychopomp. This was probably his original function, and he may have been a late inclusion in the Olympic pantheon; Hermes is described as the "youngest" Olympian, and some myths, including his theft of Apollo's cows, describe his initial coming into contact with celestial deities. Hermes therefore came to be worshiped as a mediator between celestial and chthonic realms, as well as the one who facilitates interactions between mortals and the divine, often being depicted on libation vessels.

Due to his mobility and his liminal nature, mediating between opposites (such as merchant/customer), he was considered the god of commerce and social intercourse, the wealth brought in business, especially sudden or unexpected enrichment, travel, roads and crossroads, borders and boundary conditions or transient, the changes from the threshold, agreements and contracts, friendship, hospitality, sexual intercourse, games, data, the draw, good luck, the sacrifices and the sacrificial animals, flocks and shepherds and the fertility of land and cattle.

In Athens, Hermes Eion came to represent the Athenian naval superiority in their defeat of the Persians, under the command of Cimon, in 475 BC. In this context, Hermes became a god associated with the Athenian empire and its expansion, and of democracy itself, as well as all of those closely associated with it, from the sailors in the navy, to the merchants who drove the economy. A section of the agora in Athens became known as the Hermai, because it was filled with a large number of herms, placed there as votive offerings by merchants and others who wished to commemorate a personal success in commerce or other public affair. The Hermai was probably destroyed in the Siege of Athens and Piraeus (87–86 BC).

In the Hellenistic period

As Greek culture and influence spread following the conquests of Alexander the Great, a period of syncretism or interpretatio graeca saw many traditional Greek deities identified with foreign counterparts. In Ptolemaic Egypt, for example, the Egyptian god Thoth was identified by Greek speakers as the Egyptian form of Hermes. The two gods were worshiped as one at the Temple of Thoth in Khemenu, a city which became known in Greek as Hermopolis. This led to Hermes gaining the attributes of a god of translation and interpretation, or more generally, a god of knowledge and learning. This is illustrated by a 3rd-century BC example of a letter sent by the priest Petosiris to King Nechopso, probably written in Alexandria c. 150 BC, stating that Hermes is the teacher of all secret wisdoms, which are accessible by the experience of religious ecstasy.

An epithet of Thoth found in the temple at Esna, "Thoth the great, the great, the great", became applied to Hermes beginning in at least 172 BC. This lent Hermes one of his most famous later titles, Hermes Trismegistus (Ἑρμῆς ὁ Τρισμέγιστος), "thrice-greatest Hermes". The figure of Hermes Trismegistus would later absorb a variety of other esoteric wisdom traditions and become a major component of Hermeticism, alchemy, and related traditions.

In the Roman period
As early as the 4th century BC, Romans had adopted Hermes into their own religion, combining his attributes and worship with the earlier Etruscan god Turms under the name Mercury. According to St. Augustin, the Latin name "Mercury" may be a title derived from "medio currens", in reference to Hermes' role as a mediator and messenger who moves between worlds. Mercury became one of the most popular Roman gods, as attested by the numerous shrines and depictions in artwork found in Pompeii. In art, the Roman Mercury continued the style of depictions found in earlier representations of both Hermes and Turms, a young, beardless god with winged shoes and/or hat, carrying the caduceus. His role as a god of boundaries, a messenger, and a psychopomp also remained unchanged following his adoption into the Roman religion (these attributes were also similar to those in the Etruscan's worship of Turms).

The Romans identified the Germanic god Odin with Mercury, and there is evidence that Germanic peoples who had contact with Roman culture also accepted this identification. Odin and Mercury/Hermes share several attributes in common. For example, both are depicted carrying a staff and wearing a wide-brimmed hat, and both are travelers or wanderers. However, the reasons for this interpretation appear to go beyond superficial similarities: Both gods are connected to the dead (Mercury as psychopomp and Odin as lord of the dead in Valhalla), both were connected to eloquent speech, and both were associated with secret knowledge. The identification of Odin as Mercury was probably also influenced by a previous association of a more Odin-like Celtic god as the "Celtic Mercurius".

A further Roman Imperial-era syncretism came in the form of Hermanubis, the result of the identification of Hermes with the Egyptian god of the dead, Anubis. Hermes and Anubis were both psychopomps the primary attribute leading to their conflation as the same god. Hermanubis depicted with a human body and a jackal head, holding the caduceus. In addition to his function of guiding souls to the afterlife, Hermanubis represented the Egyptian priesthood the investigation of truth.

Beginning around the turn of the 1st century AD, a process began by which, in certain traditions Hermes became euhemerised – that is, interpreted as a historical, mortal figure who had become divine or elevated to godlike status in legend. Numerous books of wisdom and magic (including astrology, theosophy, and alchemy) were attributed to this "historical" Hermes, usually identified in his Alexandrian form of Hermes Trismegistus. As a collection, these works are referred to as the Hermetica.

In the Middle Ages
Though worship of Hermes had been almost fully suppressed in the Roman Empire following the Christian persecution of paganism under Theodosius I in the 4th century AD, Hermes continued to be recognized as a mystical or prophetic figure, though a mortal one, by Christian scholars. Early medieval Christians such as Augustine believed that a euhemerised Hermes Trismegistus had been an ancient pagan prophet who predicted the emergence of Christianity in his writings. Some Christian philosophers in the medieval and Renaissance periods believed in the existence of a "prisca theologia", a single thread of true theology that could be found uniting all religions. Christian philosophers used Hermetic writings and other ancient philosophical literature to support their belief in the prisca theologia, arguing that Hermes Trismegistus was a contemporary of Moses, or that he was the third in a line of important prophets after Enoch and Noah.

The 10th-century Suda attempted to further Christianize the figure of Hermes, claiming that "He was called Trismegistus on account of his praise of the trinity, saying there is one divine nature in the trinity."

Temples and sacred places
There are only three temples known to have been specifically dedicated to Hermes during the Classical Greek period, all of them in Arcadia. Though there are a few references in ancient literature to "numerous" temples of Hermes, this may be poetic license describing the ubiquitous herms, or other, smaller shrines to Hermes located in the temples of other deities. One of the oldest places of worship for Hermes was Mount Cyllene in Arcadia, where some myths say he was born. Tradition holds that his first temple was built by Lycaon. From there, the Hermes cult would have been taken to Athens, from which it radiated to the whole of Greece. In the Roman period, additional temples to Hermes (Mercury) were constructed across the Empire, including several in modern-day Tunisia. Mercury's temple in Rome was situated in the Circus Maximus, between the Aventine and Palatine hills, and was built in 495 BC.

In most places, temples were consecrated to Hermes in conjunction with Aphrodite, as in Attica, Arcadia, Crete, Samos and in Magna Graecia. Several ex-votos found in his temples revealed his role as initiator of young adulthood, among them soldiers and hunters, since war and certain forms of hunting were seen as ceremonial initiatory ordeals. This function of Hermes explains why some images in temples and other vessels show him as a teenager.

As a patron of the gym and fighting, Hermes had statues in gyms and he was also worshiped in the sanctuary of the Twelve Gods in Olympia where Greeks celebrated the Olympic Games.  His statue was held there on an altar dedicated to him and Apollo together.
A temple within the Aventine was consecrated in 495 BC.

Pausanias wrote that during his time, at Megalopolis people could see the ruins of the temple of Hermes Acacesius.
In addition, the Tricrena (Τρίκρηνα, meaning Three Springs) mountains at Pheneus were sacred to Hermes, because three springs were there and according to the legend, Hermes was washed in them, after birth, by the nymphs of the mountain.
Furthermore, at Pharae there was a water sacred to Hermes. The name of the spring was Hermes' stream and the fish in it were not caught, being considered sacred to the god.

Sacrifices to Hermes involved honey, cakes, pigs, goats, and lambs. In the city of Tanagra, it was believed that Hermes had been nursed under a wild strawberry tree, the remains of which were held there in the shrine of Hermes Promachus, and in the hills Phene ran three waterways that were sacred to him, because he was believed to have been bathed there at birth.

Festivals
Hermes' feast was the Hermaea, which was celebrated with sacrifices to the god and with athletics and gymnastics, possibly having been established in the 6th century BC, but no documentation on the festival before the 4th century BC survives. However, Plato said that Socrates attended a Hermaea. Of all the festivals involving Greek games, these were the most like initiations because participation in them was restricted to young boys and excluded adults.

Epithets

Atlantiades
Hermes was also called Atlantiades, because his mother, Maia was the daughter of Atlas.

Argeïphontes 
Hermes' epithet Argeïphontes, meaning "slayer of Argus", recalls the slaying of the hundred-eyed giant Argus Panoptes by the messenger god. Argus was watching over the heifer-nymph Io in the sanctuary of Queen Hera, herself in Argos. Hermes placed a charm on Argus' eyes with the caduceus to cause the giant to sleep, after which he slew the giant. The eyes were then put into the tail of the peacock, a symbol of the goddess Hera.

Cyllenian 
Hermes was called Cyllenian, because according to some myths he was born at the Mount Cyllene, and nursed by the Oread nymph Cyllene.

Kriophoros

In ancient Greek culture, kriophoros or criophorus, the "ram-bearer," is a figure that commemorates the solemn sacrifice of a ram. It becomes an epithet of Hermes.

Messenger and guide

The chief office of the god was as messenger. Explicitly, at least in sources of classical writings, of Euripides' Electra and Iphigenia in Aulis and in Epictetus' Discourses. Hermes (Diactoros, Angelos) the messenger, is in fact only seen in this role, for Zeus, from within the pages of the Odyssey. The messenger divine and herald of the Gods, he wears the gifts from his father, the petasos and talaria.

 Hodios, patron of travelers and wayfarers.
 Oneiropompus, conductor of dreams.
 Poimandres, shepherd of men.
 Psychopompos, conveyor or conductor of souls, and psychogogue, conductor or leader of souls in (or through) the underworld.
 Sokos Eriounios, a Homeric epithet with a much-debated meaning – probably "swift, good-running." But in the Hymn to Hermes Eriounios is etymologized as "very beneficial."
 Chrysorappis, "with golden wand," a Homeric epithet.

Trade

 Agoraeus, of the agora; belonging to the market (Aristophanes)
 Empolaios, "engaged in traffic and commerce"

Hermes is sometimes depicted in art works holding a purse.

Dolios ("tricky")
No cult to Hermes Dolios existed in Attica, and so this form of Hermes seems to have existed in speech only.

Hermes Dolio is ambiguous. According to prominent folklorist Yeleazar Meletinsky, Hermes is a deified trickster and master of thieves ("a plunderer, a cattle-raider, a night-watching" in the Homeric Hymn to Hermes) and deception (Euripides) and (possibly evil) tricks and trickeries, crafty (from lit. god of craft), the cheat, the god of stealth. He is also known as the friendliest to man, cunning, treacherous, and a schemer.

Hermes Dolios was worshipped at Pellene and invoked through Odysseus.

Hermes is amoral like a baby. Zeus sent Hermes as a teacher to humanity to teach them knowledge of and value of justice and to improve inter-personal relationships ("bonding between mortals").

Considered to have a mastery of rhetorical persuasion and special pleading, the god typically has nocturnal modus operandi. Hermes knows the boundaries and crosses the borders of them to confuse their definition.

Thief

In the Lang translation of the Homeric Hymn to Hermes, the god after being born is described as a robber, a captain of raiders, and a thief of the gates.

According to the late Jungian psychotherapist López-Pedraza, everything Hermes thieves, he later sacrifices to the gods.

Patron of thieves
Autolycus received his skills as the greatest of thieves due to sacrificing to Hermes as his patron.

Additional
Other epithets included:
 chthonius – at the festival Athenia Chytri sacrifices are made to this visage of the god only.
 cyllenius, born on Mount Kyllini
 epimelios, guardian of flocks
 koinos
 ploutodotes, giver of wealth (as inventor of fire)
 proopylaios, "before the gate", "guardian of the gate"; Pylaios, "doorkeeper"
 strophaios, "standing at the door post"
 Stropheus, "the socket in which the pivot of the door moves" (Kerényi in Edwardson) or "door-hinge". Protector of the door (that is the boundary), to the temple
 Agoraios, the patron of gymnasia
 Akaketos "without guile," "gracious," a Homeric epithet.
 Dotor Eaon "giver of good things," a Homeric epithet.

Mythology

Early Greek sources

Homer and Hesiod

Homer and Hesiod portrayed Hermes as the author of skilled or deceptive acts and also as a benefactor of mortals. In the Iliad, he is called "the bringer of good luck", "guide and guardian", and "excellent in all the tricks". He was a divine ally of the Greeks against the Trojans. However, he did protect Priam when he went to the Greek camp to retrieve the body of his son Hector and accompanied them back to Troy.

He also rescued Ares from a brazen vessel where he had been imprisoned by Otus and Ephialtes. In the Odyssey, Hermes helps his great-grand son, the protagonist Odysseus, by informing him about the fate of his companions, who were turned into animals by the power of Circe. Hermes instructed Odysseus to protect himself by chewing a magic herb; he also told Calypso of Zeus' order to free Odysseus from her island to allow him to continue his journey back home. When Odysseus killed the suitors of his wife, Hermes led their souls to Hades. In The Works and Days, when Zeus ordered Hephaestus to create Pandora to disgrace humanity by punishing Prometheus's act of giving fire to man, every god gave her a gift, and Hermes' gifts were lies, seductive words, and a dubious character. Hermes was then instructed to take her as wife to Epimetheus.

The Homeric Hymn 4 to Hermes, which tells the story of the god's birth and his subsequent theft of Apollo's sacred cattle, invokes him as the one "of many shifts (polytropos), blandly cunning, a robber, a cattle driver, a bringer of dreams, a watcher by night, a thief at the gates, one who was soon to show forth wonderful deeds among the deathless gods." The word polutropos ("of many shifts, turning many ways, of many devices, ingenious, or much wandering") is also used to describe Odysseus in the first line of the Odyssey. In addition to the chelys lyre, Hermes was believed to have invented many types of racing and the sport of wrestling, and therefore was a patron of athletes.

Athenian tragic playwrights
Aeschylus wrote in The Eumenides that Hermes helped Orestes kill Clytemnestra under a false identity and other stratagems, and also said that he was the god of searches, and those who seek things lost or stolen. In Philoctetes, Sophocles invokes Hermes when Odysseus needs to convince Philoctetes to join the Trojan War on the side of the Greeks, and in Euripides' Rhesus Hermes helps Dolon spy on the Greek navy.

Aesop
Aesop featured him in several of his fables, as ruler of the gate of prophetic dreams, as the god of athletes, of edible roots, and of hospitality. He also said that Hermes had assigned each person his share of intelligence.

Hellenistic Greek sources

Several writers of the Hellenistic period expanded the list of Hermes's achievements. Callimachus said that Hermes disguised himself as a Cyclops to scare the Oceanids and was disobedient to his mother. One of the Orphic Hymns Khthonios is dedicated to Hermes, indicating that he was also a god of the underworld.  Aeschylus had called him by this epithet several times. Another is the Orphic Hymn to Hermes, where his association with the athletic games held is mystic in tone.

Phlegon of Tralles said he was invoked to ward off ghosts, and Apollodorus reports several events involving Hermes. According to Apollodorus, Hermes participated in the Gigantomachy in defense of Olympus; was given the task of bringing baby Dionysus to be cared for by Ino and Athamas and later took him to be cared for by the Nysan nymphs, later called the Hyades; lead Hera, Athena and Aphrodite to Paris to be judged by him in a beauty contest; favored the young Hercules by giving him a sword when he finished his education; and aided Perseus in fetching the head of the Gorgon Medusa.

Anyte of Tegea of the 3rd century BC, in the translation by Richard Aldington, wrote, I Hermes stand here at the crossroads by the wind beaten orchard, near the hoary grey coast; and I keep a resting place for weary men. And the cool stainless spring gushes out.

Lovers, victims and children

Peitho, the goddess of seduction and persuasion, was said by Nonnus to be the wife of Hermes.
Aphrodite, the goddess of love and beauty, was wooed by Hermes. After she had rejected him, Hermes sought the help of Zeus to seduce her. Zeus, out of pity, sent his eagle to take away Aphrodite's sandal when she was bathing, and gave it to Hermes. When Aphrodite came looking for the sandal, Hermes made love to her. She bore him a son, Hermaphroditus.
Daeira, an Oceanid and an underworld goddess, mated with Hermes and gave birth to a son named Eleusis.
Apemosyne, a princess of Crete, was travelling to Rhodes one day with her brother Althaemenes. Hermes saw her and fell in love with her, but Apemosyne fled from him. Hermes could not catch her because she ran faster than him. The god then devised a plan and laid some freshly skinned hides across her path. Later, on her way back from a spring, Apemosyne slipped on those hides and fell. At that moment, Hermes caught her and raped her. When Apemosyne told her brother what had happened, he became angry, thinking that she was lying about being molested by the god. In his anger, he kicked her to death.
Chione, a princess of Phokis, attracted the attention of Hermes. He used his wand to put her to sleep and slept with her. To Hermes she bore a son, Autolycus.
Herse, an Athenian princess was loved by Hermes and bore a son named Cephalus to him. 
Iphthime, a princess of Doros was loved by Hermes and bore him three Satyroi – named Pherespondos, Lykos and Pronomos.
Penelopeia, an Arcadian nymph, was loved by Hermes. It is said that Hermes had sex with her in the form of a goat, which resulted in their son, the god Pan, having goat legs. She has been confused or conflated with Penelope, the wife of Odysseus.
The Oreads, the nymphs of the mountains were said to mate with Hermes in the highlands, breeding more of their kind.
Tanagra was a nymph for whom the gods Ares and Hermes competed in a boxing match. Hermes won and carried her off to Tanagra in Boeotia.

According to Hyginus' Fabula, Pan, the Greek god of nature, shepherds and flocks, is the son of Hermes through the nymph Dryope. It is likely that the worship of Hermes himself actually originated as an aspect of Pan as the god of boundaries, which could explain their association as parent and child in Hyginus. In other sources, the god Priapus is understood as a son of Hermes.

According to the mythographer Apollodorus, Autolycus, the Prince of Thieves, was a son of Hermes and Chione, making Hermes a great-grandfather of Odysseus.

Once, Hermes chased either Persephone or Hecate with the aim to rape her; but the goddess snored or roared in anger, frightening him off so that he desisted, hence her earning the name "Brimo" ("angry").

Hermes also loved young men in pederastic relationships where he bestowed and/or taught something related to combat, athletics, herding, poetry and music. Photius wrote that Polydeuces (Pollux), one of the Dioscuri, was a lover of Hermes, to whom he gifted the Thessalian horse Dotor. Amphion became a great singer and musician after his lover Hermes taught him to play and gave him a golden lyre. Crocus was said to be a beloved of Hermes and was accidentally killed by the god in a game of discus when he unexpectedly stood up; as the unfortunate youth's blood dripped on the soil, the saffron flower came to be. Perseus received the divine items (talaria, petasos, and the helm of darkness) from Hermes because he loved him. And Daphnis, a Sicilian shepherd who was said to be the inventor of pastoral poetry, is said to be a son or sometimes eromenos of Hermes.

Genealogy

In Jungian psychology

For Carl Jung, Hermes's role as messenger between realms and as guide to the underworld made him the god of the unconscious, the mediator between the conscious and unconscious parts of the mind, and the guide for inner journeys.
Jung considered the gods Thoth and Hermes to be counterparts. In Jungian psychology especially, Hermes is seen as relevant to study of the phenomenon of synchronicity (together with Pan and Dionysus):

He is identified by some with the archetype of healer, as the ancient Greeks ascribed healing magic to him.

In the context of abnormal psychology Samuels (1986) states that Jung considers Hermes the archetype for narcissistic disorder; however, he lends the disorder a "positive" (beneficious) aspect, and represents both the good and bad of narcissism.

For López-Pedraza, Hermes is the protector of psychotherapy. For McNeely, Hermes is a god of the healing arts.

According to Christopher Booker, all the roles Hermes held in ancient Greek thought all considered reveals Hermes to be a guide or observer of transition.

For Jung, Hermes's role as trickster made him a guide through the psychotherapeutic process.

Hermes in popular culture 
See Greek mythology in popular culture

See also
 Hermes Trismegistus
 Family tree of the Greek gods

Notes

References
 Apollodorus, Apollodorus, The Library, with an English Translation by Sir James George Frazer, F.B.A., F.R.S. in 2 Volumes. Cambridge, Massachusetts, Harvard University Press; London, William Heinemann Ltd. 1921. . Online version at the Perseus Digital Library.
 Burkert, Walter, Greek Religion, Harvard University Press, 1985. .
 Gantz, Timothy, Early Greek Myth: A Guide to Literary and Artistic Sources, Johns Hopkins University Press, 1996, Two volumes:  (Vol. 1),  (Vol. 2).
 Hesiod, Theogony, in The Homeric Hymns and Homerica with an English Translation by Hugh G. Evelyn-White, Cambridge, MA., Harvard University Press; London, William Heinemann Ltd. 1914. Online version at the Perseus Digital Library.
 Hesiod, The Shield. Catalogue of Women. Other Fragments. Edited and translated by Glenn W. Most. Loeb Classical Library 503. Cambridge, MA: Harvard University Press, 2007, .
 Homer, The Iliad with an English Translation by A.T. Murray, PhD in two volumes. Cambridge, MA., Harvard University Press; London, William Heinemann, Ltd. 1924. Online version at the Perseus Digital Library.
 Homer; The Odyssey with an English Translation by A.T. Murray, PH.D. in two volumes. Cambridge, MA., Harvard University Press; London, William Heinemann, Ltd. 1919. Online version at the Perseus Digital Library.
 Lay, M. G., James E. Vance Jr.; Ways of the World: A History of the World's Roads and of the Vehicles That Used Them, Rutgers University Press, 1992, .
 
 Pausanias, Pausanias Description of Greece with an English Translation by W.H.S. Jones, Litt.D., and H.A. Ormerod, M.A., in 4 Volumes. Cambridge, MA, Harvard University Press; London, William Heinemann Ltd. 1918. Online version at the Perseus Digital Library.
 Tripp, Edward, Crowell's Handbook of Classical Mythology, Thomas Y. Crowell Co; First edition (June 1970). .

Further reading
 Allan, Arlene. 2018. Hermes. Gods and Heroes of the Ancient World.  London; New York:  Routledge. 
Baudy, Gerhard, and Anne Ley. 2006. "Hermes." In Der Neue Pauly. Vol 5. Edited by Hubert Cancik and Helmuth Schneider. Stuttgart, and Weimar, Germany: Verlag J. B. Metzler.
 Bungard, Christopher. 2011. "Lies, Lyres, and Laughter: Surplus Potential in the Homeric Hymn to Hermes." Arethusa 44.2: 143–165.
 Bungard, Christopher. 2012. "Reconsidering Zeus' Order: The Reconciliation of Apollo and Hermes." The Classical World 105.4: 433–469.
 Fowden, Garth. 1993. The Egyptian Hermes. A Historical Approach to the Late Pagan Mind. Princeton, NJ: Princeton Univ. Press.
 Johnston, Sarah Iles. 2002. "Myth, Festival, and Poet: The Homeric Hymn to Hermes and its Performative Context." Classical Philology 97:109–132.
 Kessler-Dimini, Elizabeth. 2008. "Tradition and Transmission: Hermes Kourotrophos in Nea Paphos, Cyprus." In Antiquity in Antiquity: Jewish and Christian Pasts in the Greco-Roman World. Edited by Gregg Gardner and K. L. Osterloh, 255–285. Tübingen, Germany: Mohr Siebeck.
 Russo, Joseph. 2000. "Athena and Hermes in Early Greek Poetry: Doubling and Complementarity." In Poesia e religione in Grecia. Studi in onore di G. Aurelio Privitera. Vol. 2. Edited by Maria Cannatà Ferra and S. Grandolini, 595–603. Perugia, Italy: Edizioni Scientifiche Italiane.
 Schachter, Albert. 1986. Cults of Boiotia. Vol. 2, Heracles to Poseidon. London: Institute of Classical Studies.
 Thomas, Oliver. 2010. "Ancient Greek Awareness of Child Language Acquisition". Glotta 86: 185–223.
 van Bladel, Kevin. 2009. The Arabic Hermes: From Pagan Sage to Prophet of Science. Oxford Studies in Late Antiquity.   Oxford/New York:  Oxford University Press.

External links

 
 Theoi Project, Hermes stories from original sources & images from classical art
 Cult of Hermes
 The Myths of Hermes 
 Ventris and Chadwick: Gods found in Mycenaean Greece: a table drawn up from Michael Ventris and John Chadwick, Documents in Mycenaean Greek second edition (Cambridge 1973)

 
Commerce gods
Deities in the Iliad
Greek trickster deities
Greek underworld
Liminal gods
LGBT themes in Greek mythology
Sports deities
Underworld gods
Psychopomps
Homosexuality and bisexuality deities
Mercurian deities
Messenger gods
Children of Zeus
Pastoral gods
Rape of Persephone
Mythological rapists
Metamorphoses characters
Deeds of Apollo
Characters in the Odyssey
Consorts of Aphrodite
Chthonic beings
Sleep deities
Greek sleep deities
Trickster gods
Greek death gods
Twelve Olympians
Kourotrophoi